Tiger Transit is the Princeton University shuttle service in and around its campus in Princeton and other nearby areas of Mercer County, New Jersey. Tiger Transit operates seven routes within the campus and around the city of Princeton. WeDriveU operates the service.

Routes 
All Tiger Transit routes are free of charge and only operate on weekdays, with the exception of Route 5 which only operates on weekends. Routes 1, 2, and 3 are open to the public and serve various areas around the greater Princeton area. Route 4 essentially functions as an alternative to the Princeton Branch, locally known as the Dinky, and therefore is only available to University ID holders. Route 5, officially known as the Weekend Shopper, combines service around most of the Princeton campus areas with service along US-1 to the Windsor Green and West Windsor Plaza malls in West Windsor, and the Quaker Bridge Mall in Clarksville.

Route List
As of Spring 2023

Fleet

Active
WeDriveU has operated these buses since February 2021, when the former operator First Transit lost their contract.

On Order

References

External links 
 Official website
 Route map

Princeton University
Bus transportation in New Jersey
Transportation in Mercer County, New Jersey
University and college bus systems